Valentina Aleksandrovna Petrenko (born 23 August 1955 in Kazakh SSR) is a Russian politician, who served as a Russian Federation Senator from Khakassia from 2001 to 2011. She served on the Committee on Social Policy and has a PhD in Education 

Born in Kazakh SSR (now Kazakhstan), she is fluent in Russian, Polish, English, and Spanish. In 1977, she graduated from the Rostov State Pedagogical Institute, majoring in teacher of biology and chemistry.

She is famous for negotiating for the release of several child hostages in 1993, for which she earned the Order “For Personal Courage”. She is also known for her iconic hairstyle.

She is married and has one daughter.

She was awarded the Order of Honour.

References

External links 
Сенатор Петренко представила карикатуру на Charlie Hebdo
 Who is Valentina Petrenko? Meet Russia's Wild-Haired Senator  Who Looks Like a James Bond Villain
 Эволюция прически сенатора Валентины Петренко глазами имидж-стилиста

1955 births
Living people
Recipients of the Order of Honour (Russia)
Recipients of the Medal of the Order "For Merit to the Fatherland" II class
Communist Party of the Soviet Union members
A Just Russia politicians
United Russia politicians
21st-century Russian politicians
Members of the Federation Council of Russia (after 2000)
21st-century Russian women politicians